Gimpo International Airport Station is a subway, railway and light rail station on the Seoul Subway Line 5 and Line 9 and AREX and Gimpo Goldline. True to its name, it serves the nearby Gimpo Airport, the hub of domestic flights in the Seoul metropolitan area as well as limited flights to/from China, Japan, and Taiwan. Upon its opening in 1996, it became the first railway station in the Korean Peninsula to directly serve an airport.

Gallery

Station layout

Vicinity
Exit 1 : Gimpo Airport Domestic Terminal
Exit 2 : Gimpo Airport International Terminal

References

Metro stations in Gangseo District, Seoul
Seoul Metropolitan Subway stations
Airport railway stations in South Korea
Railway stations opened in 1996
Gimpo International Airport
1996 establishments in South Korea
20th-century architecture in South Korea